Sean Anders (born June 19, 1969) is an American film director and screenwriter.

Career

He co-wrote and directed the 2005 film Never Been Thawed, the 2008 film Sex Drive, the 2014 film Horrible Bosses 2, the 2015 film Daddy's Home, the 2017 sequel Daddy's Home 2, the 2018 film Instant Family based on his own history, and the 2022 holiday film Spirited. He also directed the 2012 comedy That's My Boy.

Anders wrote or co-wrote 2010's Hot Tub Time Machine and She's Out of My League, 2011's Mr. Popper's Penguins, 2013's We're the Millers, and the 2014 Dumb and Dumber sequel Dumb and Dumber To.

He is the brother of actress Andrea Anders.

Filmography

Accolade(s)
For 2012's That's My Boy, Anders was nominated for Worst Director, at the 33rd Golden Raspberry Awards.

References

External links

1983 births
American male screenwriters
Comedy film directors
Living people
People from DeForest, Wisconsin
Film directors from Wisconsin
Screenwriters from Wisconsin